Antichan-de-Frontignes is a commune in the Haute-Garonne department in the Occitanie region of south-western France.

The inhabitants of the commune are known as Antichanais or Antichanaises in French.

Geography

Antichan-de-Frontignes is located at the foot of the Pyrenees in the Comminges region some 40 km east by south-east of Bagnères-de-Bigorre and 19 km south by south-west of Saint-Gaudens. Access to the commune is by the D618 road which branches from the D331 east of Ore and goes to the village then continues north-east by a roundabout route to Juzet-d'Izaut. There is also a local road going from the D618 north of the village to Saint-Pé-d'Ardet. Most of the commune is heavily forested however there is some farmland near the village.

Neighbouring communes and villages

Administration

List of Successive Mayors

Demography
In 2017 the commune had 157 inhabitants.

Sites and monuments

The village is the point of departure for a hiking trail which crosses the Col des Ares 4.5 km from the village then continues to the summits of the Pic du Gar and the Saillant Peak.
The Church of Notre-Dame of the Assumption

See also
Communes of the Haute-Garonne department

References

External links
Antichan-de-Frontignes on the old IGN website 
Antichan-de-Frontignes on Géoportail, National Geographic Institute (IGN) website 
Antichan-de-Frontignes on the 1750 Cassini Map

Communes of Haute-Garonne